Mark van Heerden (born 21 February 1991) is a South African cricketer. He played in nine first-class and two Twenty20 matches for Boland in 2013 and 2014.

See also
 List of Boland representative cricketers

References

External links
 

1991 births
Living people
South African cricketers
Boland cricketers
Cricketers from Johannesburg